John III of Schoenberg (died: 26 September 1517 in Zeitz) was from 1492 to 1517 Bishop of Naumburg-Zeitz.

Origin 
John was a member of the noble Schoenberg family, which provided several bishops to the dioceses of Naumburg and Meisse.  He was coadjutor to his uncle Dietrich IV of Schoenberg from 1483 and succeeded him in 1492.  His parents were Henry of Schoenberg at Stollberg (d. 1507), who was captain of Schellenberg and Wolkenstein and an advisor to the Duke, and his wife, Ilse von Pflugk.

Life 
John studied at the University of Leipzig, and in Cologne.  He was dean of Magdeburg, a canon of Meissen, provost at Bautzen and then magister scholarum of the cathedral chapter in Meissen. Pope Innocent VIII appointed him bishop, even though the cathedral chapter objected. The lucrative silver mining at Schneeberg continued.  John III had a habit of appointing relatives to ecclesiastical offices, including two of his brothers.  There indications that he may have been temporary mentally "confused" towards the end of his life.

In 1511 the chapter proposed to appoint canon Vincent of Schleinitz as coadjutor, but the House of Wettin saw to it that their candidate Philip of the Palatinate was appointed instead.

John died in 1517 and was buried in Naumburg Cathedral.  A bronze plaque of his tomb has survived.

References and sources 
 Heinz Wießner: Das Bistum Naumburg 1 - Die Diözese 2, in: Max-Planck-Institut für Geschichte (eds.): Germania Sacra, NF 35,2, Die Bistumer der Kirchenprovinz Magdeburg, Berlin/New York, 1998, pp. 938–951.

Roman Catholic bishops of Naumburg
Thuringian nobility
15th-century German people
16th-century German people
1517 deaths
Year of birth unknown